Fashion and clothing in Iran is divided into several historical periods. The exact date of the emergence of weaving in Iran is not yet known, but it is likely to coincide with the emergence of civilization. Clothing in Iran is mentioned in Persian mythology. Ferdowsi and many historians have considered Keyumars to be the inventor of the use of animals' skin and hair as clothing. Some historians have also mentioned Hushang as the first inventor of the use of living skins as clothing. Ferdowsi considers Tahmuras to be a kind of textile initiator in Iran. There are historical discoveries in northern Iran from about 6,000 BC that refer to wool weaving at the time. Other discoveries in central Iran dating back to 4200 BC have shown that the animals' skin has not been the only clothing worn on the Iranian plateau since those years. The clothing of ancient Iran took an advanced form, and the fabric and color of clothing became very important at that time. Depending on the social status, eminence, climate of the region and the season, Persian clothing during the Achaemenian period took various forms. The philosophy used in this clothing, in addition to being functional, also had an aesthetic role.

Beauty pageant festivals inside Iran were not held after the 1979 revolution, and the last selection ceremony of the beauty queen of Iran was held in 1978 in this country. After this, a high number of Iranian girls participated in the Beauty pageant and Miss Universe outside of Iran. Sahar Biniaz (Miss Universe Canada 2012) and Shermineh Shahrivar (Miss Germany and Miss Europe) are examples of Iranian models outside Iran.

History 
Fashion in Iran is divided into several historical periods. The exact date of the emergence of weaving in Iran is not yet known, but it is likely to coincide with the emergence of civilization. Clothing in Iran is mentioned in Persian mythology. Ferdowsi and many historians have considered Keyumars to be the inventor of the use of animals' skin and hair as clothing. Some historians have also mentioned Hushang as the first inventor of the use of living skins as clothing. Ferdowsi considers Tahmuras to be a kind of textile initiator in Iran. There are historical discoveries in northern Iran from about 6,000 BC that refer to wool weaving at the time. Other discoveries in central Iran dating back to 4200 BC have shown that the animals' skin has not been the only clothing worn on the Iranian plateau since those years. The clothing of ancient Iran took an advanced form, and the fabric and color of clothing became very important at that time. Depending on the social status, eminence, climate of the region and the season, Persian clothing during the Achaemenian period took various forms. The philosophy used in this clothing, in addition to being functional, also had an aesthetic role.

After 1979 revolution 
In Iran, since 1981, after the 1979 Islamic Revolution, the hijab has become compulsory. All women are required to wear loose-fitting clothing and a headscarf in public.

The festivals of the Beauty pageant inside Iran were not held after the 1979 revolution, and the last selection ceremony of the beauty queen of Iran was held in 1978 in this country. After this, a high number of Iranian girls participated in the Beauty pageant and Miss Universe outside of Iran. Sahar Biniaz (Miss Universe Canada 2012) and Shermineh Shahrivar (Miss Germany and Miss Europe) are examples of Iranian models outside Iran.

Girls of Enghelab was a series of protests against compulsory hijab in Iran. The protests were inspired by Vida Movahed, an Iranian woman known as the Girl of Enghelab Street, who stood in the crowd on a utility box in the Enghelab Street (Revolution Street) of Tehran on 27 December 2017, tied her hijab, a white headscarf, to a stick, and waved it to the crowd as a flag. She was arrested on that day and was released temporary on bail a month later, on 28 January 2018. Some people believe that Movahed's action was based on Masih Alinejad's call for White Wednesdays, a protest movement that the presenter at VOA Persian Television started in early 2017. Other women later re-enacted her protest and posted photos of their actions on social media. These women are described as the "Girls of Enghelab Street" and "The Girls Of Revolution Street" in the English sources.

Women's fashion 

Attempts at changing dress norms (and perspectives toward it) occurred in mid-1930s when pro-Western ruler Reza Shah issued a decree Kashf-e hijab banning all veils. Many types of male traditional clothing were also banned. Western historians state that this would have been a progressive step if women had indeed chosen to do it themselves, but instead this ban humiliated and alienated many Iranian women, since its effect was comparable to the hypothetical situation in which the European women had suddenly been ordered to go out topless into the street.

A far larger escalation of violence occurred in the summer of 1935 when Reza Shah ordered all men to wear European-style bowler hat, which was Western par excellence. This provoked massive non-violent demonstrations in July in the city of Mashhad. Under next ruler, wearing of the headscarf or chador was no longer an offence, but for his regime it became a hindrance to climbing the social ladder as it was considered a badge of backwardness and an indicator of being a member of the lower class.

A few years prior to the Iranian revolution, a tendency towards questioning the relevance of Eurocentric gender roles as the model for Iranian society gained much ground among university students, and this sentiment was manifested in street demonstrations where many women from the non-veiled middle classes put on the veil and symbolically rejected the gender ideology of Pahlavi regime and its aggressive deculturalization. 
Wearing of headscarf and chador was one of main symbols of the 1979 revolution, Wearing headscarves and chadors was used as a significant populist tool and Iranian veiled women played an important rule in the revolution's victory. 
Since hijab was legally imposed on all Iranian women in 1984, post revolutionary Iranian women's fashion has seen Iranian women attempt to work within the narrow confines of the Islamic modesty code, with the typical attire gradually evolving from the standard black chador to a rousari (simple headscarf) combined with other colorful elements of clothing.

Before the Iranian Islamic Revolution of 1979 (during the reign of Mohammad Reza Pahlavi, the last Shah of Iran), the hijab was not compulsory.

In the Islamic law of Iran imposed shortly after the 1979 revolution, article 638 of 5th book of Islamic Penal Code (called Sanctions and deterrent penalties) women who do not wear a hijab may be imprisoned from ten days to two months, and/or required to pay fines from 50,000 up to 500,000 rials. Fines are recalculated in the courts to index for inflation.

Article 639 of the same book says, two types of people shall be sentenced one year to ten years' imprisonment; first a person who establishes or directs a place of immorality or prostitution, second, a person who facilitates or encourages people to commit immorality or prostitution.

Iran has an advanced leather industry for women's clothing, however, it needs technology development for export.

Agencies and Models 
There is a range of fashion models from Iran (and Iranian-born) that made it to a high-level fame, such as Nazanin Afshin-Jam, Farzan Athari, Sahar Biniaz, Mahlagha Jaberi, Mandana Karimi, Aylar Lie, Leyla Milani, Shermine Shahrivar and Sadaf Taherian.

See also 

 History of fashion design
 Shahin Ebrahimzadeh-Pezeshki, textile artist, and historian of Persian traditional clothing and Iranian tribal clothing

References

External links 

 

Iranian fashion
Iranian clothing